Pseudocolaspis chrysites (or Macrocoma chrysites) is a species of leaf beetle from East Africa and the Arabian Peninsula. It was first described by the German entomologist Carl Eduard Adolph Gerstaecker in 1871. The species is sometimes included within the genus Macrocoma, for example in the Catalogue of Palaearctic Coleoptera.

Distribution
P. chrysites is reported from the Democratic Republic of the Congo, Yemen, Ethiopia, Tanzania and Mozambique. Reports of the species from the Arabian Peninsula are probably erroneous.

References

Eumolpinae
Beetles of the Democratic Republic of the Congo
Insects of Ethiopia
Insects of Tanzania
Insects of Mozambique
Insects of the Arabian Peninsula
Beetles described in 1871
Taxa named by Carl Eduard Adolph Gerstaecker